Lee Min-ho (born May 10, 1982), better known as Boom (Hangul: 붐), is a South Korean rapper, singer, actor, radio host, and television presenter. He has made numerous television appearances in South Korean comedy shows and has acted in sitcoms as well.

Career 
He debuted in 1997 with the group Key with the first album Key. After their disbandment in 1998, he joined Nuclear in 1999 and released one album, Nuclear, before disbandment. Later in 2001, he joined Lexa, which disbanded after a year. In 2006, Boom released his first solo single "Boom Up", followed by his second single "Shout Out" in 2007.

Boom gained popularity through his comic appearances on variety shows such as X-man and Love Letter. He went on to host shows such as Mnet's School of Rock, although it was not until 2008 where he became well known as an MC through popular shows such as Idol Show, Star King and Champagne. From 2009, he hosted a special segment, Boom Academy, with Super Junior's Leeteuk, Eunhyuk and Shindong, on SBS' Strong Heart.

On October 29, 2009, Boom was enlisted for mandatory military service at a military training center in Gangwon-do Province. He reported to the 102 Replacement Depot in Chuncheon for six weeks of basic training followed by 22 months of active duty. He appeared on March 5, 2010 in an Armed Forces Television event where he was the MC for USO type show featuring girl group Kara. During the performance, he was dressed in a Republic of Korea Navy enlisted dress uniform.

Boom was discharged from the army on August 22, 2011 by the Defense Media Agency of the Ministry of National Defense where he had been serving as a PR agent. Boom returned to Strong Heart as regular guest, known as one of the six-fixed panelists and to lead Boom Academy. He released a music video, "Boom is Back", to celebrate his discharge and signed onto host SBS' radio show Young Street.

Controversies 
In November 10 and 11, 2013, Boom and several other celebrities, including Tak Jae-hoon, Andy Lee, Lee Soo-geun and Yang Se-hyung, were prosecuted for partaking in illegal gambling. The Seoul Central District Court classified Boom's case as a general gambling crime, and he was fined 5 million won.

Personal life 
On March 10, 2022, Boom announced through his fan cafe and agency that he would be marrying a non-celebrity girlfriend on April 9, 2022.

Filmography

Variety shows

Present shows

Former shows

TV appearances

Television series

Film

Hosting

Radio

Discography

Solo Activities

Singles 
 Boom Up – June 26, 2006
 Shout Out (질러) – March 28, 2007
 Boom's Friend Nyugyu Song (붐친구 뉴규쏭) – April 16, 2009
 Boom's Back (붐스백) – September 7, 2011
 Leave it to Play (놀게 냅둬) ft. Gaeko of Dynamic Duo – July 10, 2012
 Beautiful (예쁘긴 했지) – November 27, 2012
 Boy Next Door (옆집오빠) – February 19, 2018

EP 
 I Don't Know How to Love Her (여자를 모른다) – May 16, 2013

As Featuring Artist 
 Kim Sung-soo – The F4 Story (ft. Boom) – March 30, 2009

As Narrator 
 Xia – Funny Song (이 노래 웃기지?) (Narr. Boom) – July 15, 2013

Group Activities

Key (1997–1998) 
 Key 1 – 1997
 Key 2 (Forever Love) – August 1998

Nuclear (1999) 
 NUCLEAR – November 1999

Lexa (2001–2002) 
 Lexa – 2001

VISIT (Project Group) (2018) 
 Because It's You (너라서) – October 22, 2018

Awards and nominations

Footnotes

References

External links 
 Official Website
 Boom's Official Fancafe
 Official Cyworld page

South Korean television presenters
South Korean male rappers
South Korean pop singers
People from Gyeonggi Province
1982 births
Living people
University of Suwon alumni
Anyang Arts High School alumni